Tottenham Lane is a street in Crouch End and Hornsey in the London Borough of Haringey. The street runs from the centre of Crouch End at the clock tower, north to the junction of the High Street and Turnpike Lane (A504).

Buildings

The street is notable for Broadway Parade (east) and Topsfield Parade (west) on either side of the street at the immediate southern end. Broadway Parade was built by the developer and architect John Cathles Hill. Topsfield Parade was built on the estate of Henry Weston Elder by James Edmondson of Highbury and replaced Topsfield Hall, a Georgian mansion that was sold in 1892. Edmonsons later built identical shopping parades in Muswell Hill.
 

At the southern end, on the corner with Elder Avenue, is The Queens, a grade II* listed public house described in Pevsner as "one of suburban London's outstanding grand pubs".

The Crouch End Hippodrome, opened as the Queen's Opera House in 1897, was a theatre that once stood at the southern end of the street on the western side. It was a reconstruction of the former Crouch End Athenaeum. Later it was a cinema before being damaged by bombing during the Second World War and subsequently demolished apart from the front which still stands in Topsfield Parade.

The grade II listed Holy Innocents Church of England church is in the street.

Hornsey railway station is in the north of the street.

References

External links 

Streets in the London Borough of Haringey
Crouch End
Hornsey